Sára Vybíralová (born 27 March 1986) is a Czech writer, translator from French, and editor.

Life and career
Sára Vybíralová was born in Brno, Czechoslovakia, on 27 March 1986. She studied French and History at the Faculty of Philosophy of the Charles University in Prague, Czech Republic. Her debut novel Spoušť received the 2016 Jiří Orten Award given to the author of a work of prose or poetry who is no older than 30 at the time of the work's completion.

Awards
2016 Jiří Orten Award

Bibliography
Spoušť. Brno: Host, 2015. .

Translations from French into Czech
Édouard Levé: Suicide, 2008. . Czech edition: Sebevražda. Rubato, 2015. .
Édouard Levé: Oeuvres, 2002. . Czech edition: Díla. Rubato, 2016, .
Leila Slimani: Chanson douce, 2016. . Czech edition: Něžná píseň. Argo, 2017. .
Liliane Giraudon: Fur: nouvelles, 1992. . Czech edition: Srstí. Rubato, 2017. .

References 

1986 births
21st-century novelists
Charles University alumni
Czech novelists
Czech translators
French–Czech translators
Living people
Writers from Brno
Czech women novelists